Joseph Cai Bingrui (born 15 September 1966) is a Chinese Catholic priest and Bishop of the Roman Catholic Diocese of Xiamen since 2010.

Biography
Cai was born into a Catholic family. In 1985 he entered the Sheshan Basilica. He was ordained a priest in 1992.

Cai was the administrator of the Roman Catholic Diocese of Xiamen in 1996. He was elected unanimously to be bishop candidate in June 2009. He became the bishop on the May 8, 2010. He was recognized by the Vatican, under the auspices of Bishop Zhan, whose diocese is also in Fujian province.

References

1966 births
Living people
21st-century Roman Catholic bishops in China